Emilia Ankiewicz (born 22 November 1990 in Elbląg) is a Polish athlete specialising in the 400 metres hurdles. She won the silver medal at the 2015 Summer Universiade. In addition, she made the final at the 2016 European Championships finishing eighth.

Competition record

Personal bests
400 metres hurdles – 55.89 (Rio de Janeiro 2016)

References

1990 births
Living people
People from Elbląg
Sportspeople from Warmian-Masurian Voivodeship
Polish female hurdlers
Athletes (track and field) at the 2016 Summer Olympics
Olympic athletes of Poland
Universiade medalists in athletics (track and field)
Universiade silver medalists for Poland
Medalists at the 2015 Summer Universiade
21st-century Polish women